B13R may refer to:

 B13R (virus protein)
 Volvo B13R, an automobile created by the Volvo Buses company